Quicksand is an American post-hardcore band from New York City, founded in 1990. Their debut self-titled EP was released on  followed by two major-label albums, Slip (1993) and Manic Compression (1995). Quicksand's sound has been compared to that of post-hardcore bands Fugazi and Helmet. The band supported their releases with extensive touring but fell short of the mainstream success anticipated by their labels. These factors and internal stress led them to separate first in 1995 and again in 1999 following a failed year-and-a-half reunion. In June 2012, Quicksand reunited for a special one-night performance and since has been playing additional live shows. The band's third album (and first full-length in 22 years), Interiors, was released on November 10, 2017, and it was followed four years later by their latest album Distant Populations (2021).

History

Formation (1990) 
The musicians who would come to form Quicksand had their roots in the New York Hardcore scene. Frontman/guitarist Walter Schreifels, the main creative force behind the Gorilla Biscuits and bassist for Youth of Today, assembled the band's lineup from his dissolved Moondog project. Guitarist Tom Capone had founded Long Island's Beyond (releasing a demo and LP via Combined Effort Records) and had previously played in Bold, writing their album Looking Back. Drummer Alan Cage had been in the experimental hardcore band Burn and played with Capone in Beyond. Bassist Sergio Vega arrived from the short lived Collapse and a later incarnation of Absolution.

Major releases, touring, and breakup (1990–1995) 
Quicksand released the 4-track EP Quicksand through hardcore independent label Revelation Records six weeks after their formation. The band performed at club venues and rose to touring North America and Europe with Helmet, Fugazi, Rage Against the Machine, Anthrax, and White Zombie. Their exposure led to the band signing a record deal with major label Polydor Records in 1992, subsequently becoming the first post-hardcore band to do so. The label issued Quicksand's first full-length album, Slip on February 9, 1993, with "Dine Alone" being their first single. The album also featured two tracks that were re-recorded from the "Quicksand" EP ("Omission" and "Unfulfilled"). The following year saw the band tour the United States with The Offspring, performing 250 live shows to support the album. On February 28, 1995, they released their latter, more successful album Manic Compression on Island Records and later that year rejoined The Offspring on their European tour. Manic Compression reached No. 135 on the Billboard 200 Chart and No. 9 on the Heatseakers Chart and garnered Quicksand an invitation to the first Vans Warped Tour. Unfortunately, internal conflict and the stresses of constant touring led to the band's break-up at the height of their success on October 12, 1995, following a show in Hollywood, California.

Reunion and unfinished album (1997–1999) 
Following Quicksand's initial split, Walter Schreifels started his World's Fastest Car project and produced records for the hardcore punk band CIV. Tom Capone joined former Helmet guitarist Pete Mengede's supergroup Handsome, releasing a self-titled album in 1997. Sergio Vega began his own solo project entitled Fully while DJing in New York City, and Alan Cage joined the alternative rock band Seaweed, who had also performed on the Warped Tour.

In mid-1997, the band members were rumored to have been considering a reunion with the intent to perform on Revelation Night at Brownies during the CMJ Music Conference that September. However, Quicksand's first public appearance since their 1995 split would not come until February 6, 1998, in Osaka, Japan. (A subsequent show in Hawaii was canceled.) In August 1998, they entered Carriage House Studios in Stamford, Connecticut with producer Steven Haigler to begin recording material written in the prior six months. After the band's first North American performance in three years on September 26, 1998, in Boulder, Colorado, they were invited to extend their tour with Deftones and Snapcase and on November 3, 1998, started what was to be ultimately their last tour. Quicksand then returned to the studio to continue working on the new album; despite the recent successful tour and a more collaborative effort in the writing process, resurfaced tensions would eventually split up the band indefinitely in late 1999 and doom the material to remain officially unreleased. The unfinished album, as well as demo material from the Manic Compression sessions, has since been circulated on the Internet.

Post-Quicksand activities (1999–2012) 
Walter Schreifels went on to form the alternative rock band Rival Schools with former bandmate and CIV drummer Sammy Siegler, releasing the album United by Fate in 2001 (before splitting in 2003). Schreifels later fronted Walking Concert on his independent record label Some Records. During that time, Schreifels mixed in occasional solo acoustic performances. In 2008, Rival Schools reformed for live performances at various festivals, and in 2011 they released their second album Pedals. Tom Capone played guitar for Instruction for the majority of the band's existence beginning in December 2002. Sergio Vega has played bass for Deftones, filling in for Chi Cheng on tour in 1999 and from June 2009 to the present, and was recruited to compose their album Diamond Eyes, which was released on May 4, 2010. Alan Cage contributed to Enemy's Hooray for Dark Matter in 2005 and later worked with New Idea Society and the hardcore band 108.

Second reunion (2012–present) 

On June 10, 2012, Quicksand was the unannounced "special guest" on the fourth night of the Revelation Records 25th Anniversary Shows at The Glass House in Pomona, California. The original members appeared together on stage for the first time in nearly 13 years, performing a five-song set that ended with their cover of The Smiths' "How Soon Is Now?". Quicksand later performed at Bowery Ballroom in New York City on August 24, the Music Hall of Williamsburg in Brooklyn, NY on August 25, and the FYF Fest in Los Angeles, California on September 1. In January 2013, Quicksand embarked on their first North American tour in 15 years. They also performed at the Pukkelpop Festival (The Shelter stage) in Hasselt, Belgium on August 15, 2013.

On July 18, 2013, Quicksand posted a photo (which had since been removed) on Twitter that involved studio activity, indicating that the band was planning to release new material. Asked in July 2017 if it was true that they were working on new material, frontman Walter Schreifels responded, "Can't confirm or deny."

On August 21, 2017, Quicksand's Twitter feed and Walter Schreifels' Instagram account teased the title of their long-awaited third album, Interiors, to be released some time this year over a 30-second video clip. On the following day, the band streamed their first single in 22 years "Illuminant", and announced that Interiors would be released on November 10, 2017, on Epitaph Records.

On September 12, 2017, while on-tour in Phoenix, Arizona, guitarist Tom Capone was arrested (and missed the evening's show at The Crescent Ballroom) for shoplifting and resisting arrest at the local CVS drug store. The band released a statement soon after that Tom was "heading home to get better," and the band resumed the tour as a three-piece. Capone never rejoined the band, shifting Schreifels to both rhythm and lead guitar duties. Their first release without Capone was the 12" EP Triptych Continuum, which was released on April 21, 2018, through Epitaph, coinciding with Record Store Day.

By April 2021, Quicksand had reportedly been working on new material for their fourth studio album. The band released their first song in three years, "Inversion", on April 13, 2021, through streaming services. The band released the single "Missile Command" on June 23 and announced that the new album would be titled Distant Populations. Distant Populations was released digitally on August 13, while a vinyl version will be released on September 25.

In mid-August 2021, Quicksand posted a video of the song "Colossus" with Stephen Brodsky on guitar and backing vocals. Brodsky subsequently accompanied Quicksand on their late 2021 tour in support of Distant Populations returning Quicksand to a four piece—the first time since the arrest of Tom Capone.

Discography

Studio albums

EPs and singles

Compilation appearances

Unreleased material

Music videos
 "Fazer" (1993)
 "Dine Alone" (1993)
 "Omission" (1993)
 "Freezing Process" (1994)
 "Thorn in My Side" (1995)
 "Delusional" (1995)
 "Illuminant" (2017)
 "Cosmonauts" (2017)
 "Inversion" (2021)
 "Missile Command" (2022)

References

External links

 

American post-hardcore musical groups
Musical groups established in 1990
Musical groups disestablished in 1999
Musical groups from New York City
Musical groups reestablished in 2012
Revelation Records artists